Intelenet Global Services is a subsidiary of Teleperformance D.I.B.S.

The company offers omni channel contact centre, digital transformation, Robotic process automation, AI and analytics, transaction processing, finance & accounting, HRO and IT to companies in the UK, US, Australia, and India.

Timeline
Intelenet Global Services was formed in October 2000. as a 50:50 Joint Venture (JV) between Tata Consultancy Services and Housing Development Finance Corporation Ltd. (HDFC) and started operations in November 2001.

In July 2004, TCS divested its 50% stake, which was purchased by Barclays Bank Plc, one of Intelenet's biggest clients. By 2006, Intelenet had grown to over 5000 people with over 20 client relationships.

In 2006, Intelenet ventured into the India domestic BPO industry with its acquisition of Sparsh BPO Services from Spanco Telesystems. Intelenet is today the largest player in the domestic BPO market with over 18000 employees in 10 locations across India, providing customer management, outbound sales and analytics in the Banking and Financial Services, Telecom, Travel, Insurance, Retail and Government sectors.

In 2007, Intelenet's management team initiated a management buyout backed by Blackstone Group, a global private equity player. Blackstone group owns 75.98% of the stake at Intelenet; 19% is held by SKM (Employee) Trust and 5.02%  by Housing Development Finance Corporation Ltd (HDFC).

In 2007, Intelenet acquired  companies in Travel and IT verticals - Upstream, a US-based BPO company with centres in Fargo, North Dakota, Chesapeake, Virginia and Campbellsville, Kentucky and Travelport ISO, the India-based captive operations of the Travelport group.

In January 2010 Intelenet opened a delivery centre in Krakow, Poland.

2014 - Intelenet Global Services was acquired by Serco Group PLC.

2016 - Serco (Indian operations) was acquired back by Intelenet Global Services.

2018 - Intelenet Global Services was acquired by Teleperformance which is a France-based BPO.

References

The Blackstone Group
Business process outsourcing companies of India
Companies based in Mumbai
Business services companies established in 2000
2000 establishments in Maharashtra
Indian companies established in 2000